Plan of Union may refer to:

Albany Plan of Union, a 1754 proposal by Benjamin Franklin at the Albany Congress of representatives of the English colonies in North America held in Albany, New York
Galloway's Plan of Union, a 1774 proposal by Pennsylvania Conservative Joseph Galloway to keep the English North American colonies in the British Empire
Plan of Union of 1801, an agreement between Congregationalist and Presbyterian churches in the United States for mutual support and joint effort in the establishment of new congregations